William Dunlap (February 19, 1766 – September 28, 1839) was a pioneer of American theater. He was a producer, playwright, and actor, as well as a historian. He managed two of New York City's earliest and most prominent theaters, the John Street Theatre (from 1796–98) and the Park Theatre (from 1798–1805). He was also an artist, despite losing an eye in childhood.

He was born in Perth Amboy, New Jersey, the son of an army officer wounded at the Battle of Quebec in 1759. In 1783, he painted a portrait of George Washington, while staying at Rockingham in Rocky Hill. The painting is now owned by the United States Senate. He later studied art under Benjamin West in London. Another teacher was Abraham Delanoy, with whom he had a handful of lessons in New York. After returning to America in 1787, he worked exclusively in the theater for 18 years, resuming painting out of economic necessity in 1805. By 1817, he was a full-time painter.

In his lifetime he produced more than sixty plays, most of which were adaptations or translations from French or German works. A few were original: these were based on American themes and had American characters.  However, he is best known for his encyclopedic three-volume History of the Rise and Progress of the Arts of Design in the United States, which was published in 1834, and which is now an invaluable source of information about artists, collecting, and artistic life generally in the colonial and federal periods.

His plays include: 
The Father (1789)
Andre (1798)
The Stranger (1798)
The Italian Father (1799)
False Shame (1799)
The Virgin of the Sun (1800)
The Glory of Columbia, Her Yeomanry (1803)
Memoirs of George Frederick Cooke (1813)
A Trip to Niagara (1828)

In 1825 Dunlap was one of the founders of the National Academy of Design, and taught at its school. He published his History of the American Theater in two volumes in 1832.

References

Further reading
 William Dunlap. A history of the rise and progress of the arts of design in the United States, new ed. Boston: C.E. Goodspeed & Co., 1918; p. 344. v.1; v.2; v.3  Google books
Wilmeth, Don B. and Christopher Bigsby, eds. The Cambridge History of American Theatre, Volume I: Beginnings to 1870. Cambridge: Cambridge University Press, 1998.
 Lyons, Maura. William Dunlap and the Construction of an American Art History. Amherst: University of Massachusetts Press, 2005.
 "THE GLORY OF COLUMBIA, HER YEOMANRY" (1803) by William Dunlap

External links

 William Dunlap
 
 
 William Dunlap Collection. Yale Collection of American Literature, Beinecke Rare Book and Manuscript Library.

1766 births
1839 deaths
18th-century American dramatists and playwrights
18th-century American painters
18th-century American male artists
American male painters
19th-century American painters
National Academy of Design faculty
National Academy of Design members
Painters from New Jersey
Writers from New Jersey
19th-century American dramatists and playwrights
American male dramatists and playwrights
People from Perth Amboy, New Jersey
19th-century American male writers
18th-century American male writers
18th-century theatre managers
19th-century theatre managers
19th-century American male artists